Charles Patrick Mackenzie (1924-1986) is best known as a senior lecturer in veterinary medicine at the Royal (Dick) School of Veterinary Studies, Edinburgh, Scotland.

Early life and career 
Charles qualified at the Royal (Dick) School of Veterinary Studies in 1952 and pursued a career in veterinary medicine for the next ten years. He spent several years in Africa, principally at the Veterinary Research Institute in Vom, Nigeria.

He returned to the UK in 1958 where he took up general practice with Gordon Ashworth in Crieff.

In 1962, Charles joined the staff of the Royal (Dick) School of Veterinary Studies and spent the rest of his professional life in charge of the small animal medical hospital at Summerhall, first as a lecturer then as senior lecturer.

His research work included many clinical subjects; blood lead and plasma cortisol levels, skin parasitic conditions, endocrine disorders, thyroid hormones, excretion of amino acids, vitamin A deficiency and hepatic damage in canine diabetes.

David L. Doxey wrote:"He was one of those rare teachers who could instill enthusiasm into his audience and, because of this and his unfailingly friendly manner; he was universally popular among the student body."

Later life 
In later years, Charles suffered recurrent bouts of ill health over a period of many years and the death of his wife, Margaret.

He died aged 62 years on 19 February 1986, leaving behind his sons, Charlie and David.

External links 
 http://www.nvri.gov.ng/
 http://www.ed.ac.uk/vet

References 

1924 births
1986 deaths
British veterinarians